Nick Nelson (born October 16, 1996) is an American football cornerback who is currently a free agent. He played college football at Hawaii and Wisconsin.

Professional career

Oakland Raiders 
Nelson was drafted by the Oakland Raiders in the fourth round (110th overall) of the 2018 NFL Draft.

On August 31, 2019, Nelson was waived by the Raiders and re-signed to the practice squad. He was promoted to the active roster on December 11, 2019. He was placed on injured reserve on December 24, 2019.

On May 18, 2020, Nelson was waived by the Raiders with a failed physical designation, and reverted to the team's reserve/physically unable to perform list the next day. He was waived with a failed physical designation on September 1, 2020.

Indianapolis Colts 
On January 5, 2021, Nelson signed a reserve/future contract with the Indianapolis Colts. He was waived/injured on August 17 and placed on injured reserve.

Career Stats

References

External links 
 

1996 births
Living people
African-American players of American football
American football cornerbacks
Hawaii Rainbow Warriors football players
Indianapolis Colts players
Las Vegas Raiders players
Oakland Raiders players
Players of American football from South Carolina
Sportspeople from Florence, South Carolina
Wisconsin Badgers football players
21st-century African-American sportspeople